James Lowry Donaldson (March 17, 1814 – November 4, 1885) was an American soldier and author. He served as a general in the Union Army during the American Civil War and was noted for his proficiency in military logistics.

Biography
Donaldson was born in Baltimore, Maryland, to James Donaldson Lowry and Mary Purviance Cox within a prominent Baltimore family. His father was a practicing attorney in Baltimore City, a member of the House of Delegates in Annapolis, and the first fallen officer at the Battle of North Point during the War of 1812. On September 1, 1832, he was appointed from Maryland to the United States Military Academy, graduating in 1836. Brevetted a second lieutenant in the 3rd U.S. Artillery, he was sent to the West on garrison duty, where his proficiency in logistics and supply management was first noted.

He later served with distinction as a first lieutenant in the Second Seminole War in Florida and then in the 1st U.S. Artillery during the Mexican–American War, where he was distinguished at the Battle of Buena Vista. Promoted to Major (United States) for gallantry in action, he then served in a variety of frontier outposts, including as the quartermaster at the military camp on Pawneee Fork in Kansas from 1859 to 1860. He led a wagon train of supplies through hostile Indian country into New Mexico Territory.

When the Civil War erupted, Donaldson was the Chief Quartermaster for the Department of New Mexico at Fort Union until the fall of 1862, when he was reassigned to the same post for the Middle Military Department in Baltimore. On November 9, 1863, he was reassigned to the Western Theater. Serving under his former West Point classmate, Montgomery C. Meigs, Colonel Donaldson was Chief Quartermaster of the Department of the Cumberland from November 9, 1863, to June 21, 1865. On January 23, 1865 President Abraham Lincoln nominated Donaldson for appointment to the grade of brevet brigadier general in the Regular Army (United States), to rank from September 14, 1864, and the United States Senate confirmed the appointment on February 14, 1865.

Donaldson organized the men of his quartermasters organization into a combat unit and served in the Battle of Nashville. Donaldson efficiently and effectively managed the huge supply bases that served the armies of Ulysses S. Grant, William T. Sherman, George H. Thomas and received their commendations in official reports.

Donaldson was Chief Quartermaster of the Military Division of Tennessee from June 23, 1865, until March 15, 1869. On December 11, 1866, President Andrew Johnson nominated Donaldson for appointment to the grade of brevet major general in the Regular Army (United States), to rank from March 13, 1865, and the United States Senate confirmed the appointment on March 2, 1867.

Donaldson retired from active service in 1869 and formally resigned from the army on January 1, 1874. He wrote Sergeant Atkins: a tale of the Florida War. (1871).

Donaldson died in Baltimore, Maryland on November 4, 1885, and was buried in Mount Auburn Cemetery, Cambridge, Massachusetts.

A stained glass window, "The Roman Centurion," in the Grace and St. Peters Church in Baltimore memorializes James Lowry Donaldson.

See also

 List of American Civil War brevet generals (Union)

Notes

References
 National Park Service webpage for Fort Union
 Eicher, John H., and David J. Eicher, Civil War High Commands. Stanford: Stanford University Press, 2001. .

External links
 
 

1814 births
1885 deaths
Writers from Baltimore
United States Military Academy alumni
American people of the Seminole Wars
American military personnel of the Mexican–American War
Union Army generals
People of Maryland in the American Civil War
Quartermasters